Bitch Epic is the second studio album by Australia rock singer-songwriter and guitarist, Deborah Conway. The album was released in November 1993 and peaked at number 18 on the Australian ARIA Charts. This remains Conway's highest-charting album.

The cover art features Conway topless and covered in Nutella. According to Conway, the title comes from "random words, cut up and pulled from a hat".

At the ARIA Music Awards of 1994, the album was nominated for two awards, ARIA Award for Best Cover Art and ARIA Award for Best Female Artist, winning for Best Cover Art .

Track listing

Charts

Certifications

References

1993 albums
ARIA Award-winning albums
Deborah Conway albums
Mushroom Records albums